{{DISPLAYTITLE:C10H18O}}
The molecular formula C10H18O (molar mass : 154.25 g/mol) may refer to:

 Borneol
 Citronellal
 Eucalyptol
 2-Decenal
 Fenchol
 Geraniol
 Grandisol
 Lavandulol
 Linalool
 Menthone
 Myrcenol
 Nerol
 Rose oxide
 Terpinen-4-ol
 Terpineol